Rob Roy Boat Club, or Robs, is a boat club based on the River Cam in Cambridge, UK, which has traditionally focused on training and racing in small boats. The club has members at all levels, from national squad through seniors and veterans to juniors and novices.

The club colours, blades and kit are Royal Irish Maroon and white and the club is a member of the Cambridgeshire Rowing Association.

History
The club was founded in 1880, making it one of the older clubs in Cambridge.

On 5 June 1880 an item appeared in the Cambridge Chronicle as follows:

Strict temperance is no longer enforced to either language or liquors.

Racing
Club members compete at head races and regattas ranging from local events on the River Cam, through to the major national events such as Henley Royal Regatta and the National Rowing Championships, to the World Cup Regattas and World Championships.

The club also competes in the Cambridge Town Bumps, which provides an enjoyable end to the summer regatta season. The first men's crew held the Headship from 1998 to 2006.

Events
Rob Roy organises the Cambridge Small Boats Head which is held in early October each year (for coxed and coxless pairs, and single and double sculls), and the Cambridge Autumn Head which is held in mid October each year (for coxed and coxless fours and quads, and eights).

Honours

British champions

References

External links
Cambridgeshire Rowing Association

Cambridge town rowing clubs
Sports clubs established in 1880
Rowing clubs in Cambridgeshire
Rowing clubs in England
Rowing clubs of the River Cam